Chaudoir is a French-language surname and may refer to:

 Elvira Chaudoir (1911–1996), Peruvian socialite and British double agent
 Georges Chaudoir (1847–1923), Belgian competitor at the 1900 Olympics (four-in-hand mail coach)
 Marguerite Chaudoir (1885–1967), Belgian national champion tennis-player and competitor at the 1920 Olympics
 Maximilien Chaudoir (1816–1881), Russian entomologist

References

French-language surnames